Millettia thonningii is a species in the genus Millettia. It is a molluscicide plant. It contains the isoflavone alpinumisoflavone that is thought to be an antischistosomal agent.

References

External links
 
 

thonningii